WelcomHotel Chennai, formerly known as the Chola Sheraton and later the My Fortune Chennai, is a five-star luxury hotel located at Cathedral Road in Chennai, India. Opened in 1975 as the "Chola Hotel", it is one of the first five-star hotels in Chennai City. It is also the first hotel to be launched under ITC's brand "My Fortune". WelcomHotel Chennai is an ISO 14001–certified hotel for its environment management systems. It is one of the hotels licensed by ITC Hotels Limited.

History
The hotel is built on the site of a historic guest house named Tilak Bhavan owned by Kasturi Ranga Iyengar. During Mahatma Gandhi's visit to Madras in 1919, the house was occupied by C. Rajagopalachari, and Gandhi chose to stay in this house from where he learnt about the infamous Rowlatt Bill. It was from here that Gandhi announced the launching of Satyagraha in protest against the draconian Act that the British Government proposed to implement. This incident, which virtually started Gandhi's freedom struggle, is commemorated in a squat pillar of the house, which is still in situ in front of the hotel. The hotel was opened on 18 October 1975 as the "Chola Hotel", marking the entry of ITC Limited into the hotel business. In 1978, Sheraton Hotels signed a marketing agreement with ITC to represent the properties of their WelcomHotels division, located across India. The hotel was managed by Sheraton beginning that year, and was rebranded as the "Chola Sheraton" in 1980 and then the "Welcomgroup Chola Sheraton" in 1991.

On 15 October 2011, the hotel was re-branded as "My Fortune, Chennai" under the Fortune Park Hotels Ltd, which is a wholly owned subsidiary of ITC Ltd, which was set up in 1995 to cater to the first-class market segment in business and leisure destinations. The hotel was again rebranded as "WelcomHotel Chennai" on 15 October 2017. Despite the change, the hotel remains a I-Class full-service hotel.

The hotel
The hotel is 10 stories high and has 90 rooms, including 48 Fortune Club exclusive rooms (with an area of 650 sq ft), 26 Fortune Club rooms (with an area of 440 sq ft), and 16 standard rooms (220 sq ft). Food and beverages include Earthen Oven, a North Indian specialty restaurant, WelcomCafe Marina, 24-hour multi-cuisine restaurant, My Deli, serving light snacks and confectioneries, and Durrant's Bar.

There are three meeting halls in the hotel—Mandapam banquet hall, with an area of 1,880 sq ft to accommodate 200 persons, Sagari with an area of 1,400 sq ft to accommodate 60 persons, and Mandapam board room with an area of 480 sq ft. accommodating 18 persons. There are also Business Center Board Room with an area of 238 sq ft accommodating 8 persons and Business Centre Office with an area of 156 sq ft accommodating 4 persons. The poolside can accommodate about 50 persons.

See also

 Hotels in Chennai
 List of tallest buildings in Chennai

References

External links
 Official website

Hotels in Chennai
Skyscraper hotels in Chennai
Hotels established in 1975
Hotel buildings completed in 1975
1975 establishments in Tamil Nadu
ITC Limited
20th-century architecture in India